The Chuna, called Uda (Üd) above the settlement of Chunsky, is a river in Irkutsk Oblast and Krasnoyarsk Krai of Russia.

The river has its sources in the southwestern parts of Irkutsk Oblast, on the northern slopes of the eastern Sayan Mountains. It then flows over the Central Siberian Plateau, and passes the Nevanka and Nizhneudinsk. Logs are floated downriver and loaded onto the Baikal–Amur Mainline at Chunsky (station name Sosnovye Rodniki). It then turns west, and joins the Biryusa to form the Taseyeva, a tributary of the Angara.

References

Rivers of Irkutsk Oblast
Rivers of Krasnoyarsk Krai